State Route 214 (SR 214) is a  route from SR 191 in Meddybemps to U.S. Route 1 (US 1) in Pembroke. For the entire length, SR 214 is called Ayers Junction Road and is in Washington County.

Major junctions

References

External links

Floodgap Roadgap's RoadsAroundME: Maine State Route 214

214
Transportation in Washington County, Maine